Ye Rongguang (born October 3, 1963) is a retired Chinese chess player. In 1990, he became the first ever Chinese chess player to gain the title of Grandmaster. He was for more than ten years the coach of women's world chess champion Zhu Chen.

Career
Born in Wenzhou, Zhejiang, Ye Rongguang competed at the 1990 Interzonal Tournament in Manila, where he finished in 44th place scoring 6/13 points. In the same year he won the Chinese Chess Championship. He reached his highest FIDE rating of 2545 in January 1991, when he was ranked 97th in the world.

Ye has competed in the China national chess team in the Chess Olympiad three times (1988–92) (games played 35: +19 −5 =11), and twice at the World Team Chess Championships (1985–89) (games played 15: +8 −5 =2), winning bronze on 6th board in 1985. Ye also competed twice at the Asian Team Chess Championship (1987, 1991), with an overall record of 13 games (+11 −1 =1). He won an individual bronze medal and an individual gold in 1987 and 1991, respectively.

Personal life
He lives in the Netherlands, and was appointed vice-chairman of the Netherlands Chinese Photographic Society.

References

External links
Official blog
Ye Rongguang, Chess games, New In Chess NICBase Online

1963 births
Living people
Chess grandmasters
Sportspeople from Wenzhou
Chess players from Zhejiang